BBC Young Musician is a televised national music competition broadcast biennially on BBC Television and BBC Radio 3. Originally BBC Young Musician of the Year, its name was changed in 2010.

The competition, a former member of the European Union of Music Competitions for Youth (EMCY), is open to UK-resident percussion, keyboard, string, brass and woodwind players, who are eighteen years of age or under on 1 January in the relevant year.

History
The competition was established in 1978 by Humphrey Burton, Walter Todds and Roy Tipping, former members of the BBC Television Music Department. Michael Hext, a trombonist, was the inaugural winner. In 1994, the percussion category was added, alongside the existing keyboard, string, brass and woodwind categories. The competition has five stages: regional auditions, category auditions, category finals, semi-finals and the final. The biennial competition is managed and produced by BBC Cymru Wales.

To date, there have been 22 winners, the youngest being 12-year-old Peter Moore. In 2014, the BBC Young Musician Jazz Award was introduced; Alexander Bone, a saxophonist, was the inaugural winner.

As a result of the success of the competition, the Eurovision Young Musicians competition was initiated in 1982. The first edition was broadcast live from Manchester's Free Trade Hall. The presenter was Humphrey Burton and the producer was Roy Tipping. The winner of BBC Young Musician often went on to represent the United Kingdom in the Eurovision Young Musicians.

The competition celebrated its 30th anniversary in May 2008 with a documentary narrated by Gethin Jones on BBC Two. BBC Four's documentary BBC Young Musician: Forty Years Young was aired on 3 April 2018. To celebrate the 40th anniversary, the first BBC Young Musician Prom was held at the Royal Albert Hall and broadcast live on 15 July 2018. Presented by Clemency Burton-Hill, the concert featured performances from past winners and finalists alongside the BBC Concert Orchestra conducted by Andrew Gourlay.

The 2020 competition was affected by the COVID-19 pandemic, after proceeding as normal up to and including the filming of the semi-final. The five category finals were broadcast in May and June 2020, with broadcast of the semi-final and recording of the final postponed, at first until the autumn, and then into 2021. The Jazz Award final was broadcast as planned on 22 November 2020, having been recorded at Cadogan Hall in the absence of an audience. The grand final was recorded in April 2021 – also without an audience – and broadcast on 2 May, preceded on 30 April by the delayed broadcast of the semi-final. The 2022 contest was deferred from spring to early autumn and was broadcast in October; the semi-final stage of the competition (introduced in 2010) was discontinued.

Broadcast
Regional heats were televised in 1978; a round before the category final was aired until 1994, and again in 2002 and 2004. From 1978 to 1984, all programmes were broadcast on BBC One until it was moved to BBC Two in 1986; however from 2002 to 2012, the heats were moved to BBC Four, with only the final aired on BBC Two.

In 2010, highlights of the new semi-final stage were also broadcast on BBC Two. In 2014, all stages of the competition moved to BBC Four, and the category finals and the grand final were broadcast on BBC Radio 3. For the 2018 competition, Radio 3 broadcast a 30-minute concert starring each competitor in the week before their category final aired.

Hosts
The following have hosted stages of the competition:

Classical Award

 Humphrey Burton (1978–1992)
 Ernest Lush (1978)
 Jane Glover (1986, 1988)
 J Mervyn Williams (1990)
 Edward Gregson (1990 final)
 Paul Daniel (1992 final)
 Sarah Greene (1994)
 Christopher Warren-Green (1996)
 Sarah Walker (1996)
 Stephanie Hughes (1998–2004)
 Alistair Appleton (2004)
 Howard Goodall (2006, 2010 final)
 Gethin Jones (2008)
 Aled Jones (2008)
 Nicola Loud (2008)
 Clemency Burton-Hill (2010–12, 2014 final, 2016, 2018 final)
 Josie D'Arby (2012, 2016 final, 2018, 2020, 2022 final)
 Alison Balsom (2014, 2016, 2018 final)
 Miloš Karadaglić (2014)
 Anna Lapwood (2020)
 Jess Gillam (2020 final, 2022)
 Alexis Ffrench (2022)

Jazz Award

 Josie D'Arby (2014, 2016, 2018)
 Soweto Kinch (2014)
 Joe Stilgoe (2016)
 YolanDa Brown (2018, 2020)
 Jamz Supernova (2022)
 Huw Stephens (2022)

Related awards

BBC Young Dancer 
A competitive dance version, BBC Young Dancer, was launched in October 2014 and first awarded in May 2015.

BBC Young Jazz Musician 
A separate competition for a Jazz Award was first held during the 2014 season, with the final broadcast on BBC Four in the week after the classical final. In 2016, the Jazz Award final was episode 7 of the 8-part BBC Four series, broadcast two days before the classical final. In 2018, the jazz competition had an upper age limit of 21 and the final was recorded for BBC Four in November as part of the London Jazz Festival; it was broadcast on 25 November, six months after the main final.

Winners

Classical Award

Jazz Award

Past finalists
Key

1970s

1978

1980s

1980

1982

1984

1986

1988

1990s

1990

1992

1994

1996

1998

2000s

2000

2002

2004
Finals for the 2004 competition took place on 2 May at the Usher Hall, Edinburgh and were televised on BBC Two. The trophy used for this year's competition was designed by John Rocha at Waterford Crystal.

2006
The 2006 finals were held at The Sage Gateshead on 20 May 2006. The adjudicators for this competition were Marin Alsop, Carlos Bonell, Peter Sadlo, Thea King, Sergei Nakariakov, Angela Hewitt and Kathryn McDowell. The overall number of finalists was significantly smaller for this competition.

2008
The 2008 finals took place at the Wales Millennium Centre in Cardiff on 10 and 11 May 2008. In celebration of thirty years of the competition broadcasting, the performances lasted for two days.

2010s

2010

2012

2014

Classical Award

Jazz Award

2016

Classical Award

Jazz Award

2018

Classical Award
The 2018 finals were held at the Symphony Hall, Birmingham, on 13 May 2018. The judges were Kerry Andrew (chair), Alpesh Chauhan, Natalie Clein, John Harle and Sunwook Kim.

Jazz Award

2020s

2020–21

Classical Award

Jazz Award

2022

Classical Award

Jazz Award

Notes

References
General

Specific

External links
 
 European Union of Music Competitions for Youth

British biennial events
Music competitions in the United Kingdom
BBC Cymru Wales television shows
British television specials
BBC Radio 3 programmes
Young Musician
Classical music television series
Youth music competitions
Awards established in 1978
Early career awards
1978 establishments in the United Kingdom
Music television specials